Echiothrix is a genus of rodent in the family Muridae endemic to Sulawesi, Indonesia.
It contains the following species:
 Central Sulawesi echiothrix (Echiothrix centrosa)
 Northern Sulawesi echiothrix (Echiothrix leucura)

References

External links
 

 
Rodents of Sulawesi
Taxa named by John Edward Gray
Rodent genera
Taxonomy articles created by Polbot